Paris, France is a 1993 Canadian erotic comedy-drama film directed by Jerry Ciccoritti and written by Tom Walmsley. The film was released in February 1995 in the United States.

Premise
Lucy (Leslie Hope), her husband Michael (Victor Ertmanis), and their business partner William (Dan Lett) are the owners of a small publishing company in Toronto. The stability of their lives are thrown into an emotional maelstrom with the arrival of Sloan (Peter Outerbridge), a former boxer-turned-writer whose first book (based on a serial killer) is about to be published by their company. Sloan gets in over his head when he embarks on a steamy affair with the sexually ravenous and frustrated Lucy, who longs to re-create her S&M-filled days in Paris gone by. In addition to her job as publisher, Lucy is also an erotic novelist exploring whether a weekend of sexual passion with Sloan can liberate her from writer's block. But the bisexual Sloan soon embarks on another affair of his own with the openly gay William which leads to sexual confusion for the writer. All in the while, Lucy's befuddled husband, Michael, slowly goes crazy over learning of his wife and business partner's dalliance with his client until he decides to join in on their bed-jumping as well.

Cast
 Leslie Hope as Lucy
 Peter Outerbridge as Sloan
 Victor Ertmanis as Michael
 Dan Lett as William
 Raoul Trujillo as Minter
 Patricia Ciccoritti as Voice of Lucy's mother

Reviews
The film was reviewed by Variety, and described as "a silly farce with few amusing moments and many more boring ones". The San Francisco Chronicle noted that "the film goes as far as a non-pornographic film can go in depicting sexuality" but "Eventually you catch on that the film isn't really making fun of itself so much as making fun of the audience for watching."

MPAA rating
Paris, France is rated NC-17 because of explicit sexual content.

Awards
The film was nominated for two Genie Awards:
 Best Achievement in Cinematography: Barry Stone
 Best Achievement in Film Editing: Roushell Goldstein

References

External links
 
 
 
 

1993 independent films
1993 comedy-drama films
1990s erotic drama films
Canadian comedy-drama films
Canadian LGBT-related films
1990s English-language films
Male bisexuality in film
Canadian erotic drama films
English-language Canadian films
Films based on Canadian novels
Films set in Toronto
Films shot in Toronto
Canadian independent films
LGBT-related comedy-drama films
1993 LGBT-related films
Films directed by Jerry Ciccoritti
BDSM in films
1990s Canadian films